Thaumatophyllum xanadu is a perennial plant belonging to the arum family Araceae and the genus Thaumatophyllum, formerly classified under the Meconostigma subgenus of Philodendron.  This plant is native to Brazil, but is widely cultivated as a landscape plant in tropical, subtropical and warm temperate climates.

History
This plant was originally reported to be a selected chance seedling that arose in 1983 in a Western Australian nursery. It was thought to be a sport or hybrid of Thaumatophyllum bipinnatifidum, then called Philodendron bipinnatifidum, and named Philodendron 'Winterbourn' and protected under Plant Breeder Rights in Australia. It was also sold under the name P. 'Showboat'. It was renamed 'Xanadu' by House Plants of Australia and released as their plant of the year in 1988.

That name was trademarked in the United States using the cultivar name 'Winterbourn' on January 19, 1988. That patent has since expired and there are now substantiated claims that this plant is not a hybrid or nursery grown cultivar but actually originated from seed collected from a wild plant in Brazil. This plant was described as Philodendron xanadu Croat, Mayo & J.Boos.

Description

Growth habit
Its flowers have dark red spathes. It may occasionally produce aerial roots.

Distinguishing features
Thaumatophyllum xanadu is a species of the genus Thaumatophyllum, which previously was the self-heading Meconostigma subgenus of Philodendron. 
"It differs from all other species of Meconostigma in details of the sexual parts of its spadix, the shape of the leaf scars on the rhizomes, shape of leaf blade, intravaginal squamules, etc".

Cultivation
Thaumatophyllum xanadu  is cultivated as a landscape plant in tropical, subtropical and warm temperate countries including warmer parts of the United States, such as Florida, Hawaii and California, South Africa, Australia and northern New Zealand. It is grown as a houseplant in cooler regions.

Toxicology
Like their relative Philodendron, Thaumatophyllum are poisonous to vertebrates, but vary in their toxicity levels. They contain calcium oxalate crystals in raphide bundles, which are poisonous and irritating. The sap may cause skin irritation. Chewing and/or ingesting parts of the plant may result in severe swelling and compromised respiratory functions.

Gallery

References

Brown, D. (1988). Aroids: Plants of the Arum Family. Portland, OR: Timber Press, 1988
Mayo, S. J. (1990).History and Infrageneric Nomenclature of Philodendron (Araceae). Kew Bulletin. Vol. 45, No. 1, pp. 37–71
Mayo, S. J. (1991). A revision of Philodendron subgenus Meconostigma (Araceae). Kew Bulletin 46: 601-681.

External links
Murky history of Philodendron xanadu
What is an Aroid?
Meconostigma Philodendrons
RHS Plant Selector - Philodendron xanadu

Flora of Brazil
Garden plants
House plants
xanadu